Drymonia velitaris is a moth of the family Notodontidae first described by Johann Siegfried Hufnagel in 1766. It is found in central and southern Europe and Anatolia.

The length of the forewings is 12–15 mm for males and 15–18 mm for females. The imago can be identified by the yellow spot on the base of the forewing. The moth flies from May to August depending on the location.

The larvae feed on oak.

External links

Fauna Europaea
Lepidoptera of Belgium 
Lepiforum e.V.
De Vlinderstichting 

Notodontidae
Moths of Europe
Moths of Asia
Taxa named by Johann Siegfried Hufnagel